Coastal engineering is a branch of civil engineering concerned with the specific demands posed by constructing at or near the coast, as well as the development of the coast itself.

The hydrodynamic impact of especially waves, tides, storm surges and tsunamis and (often) the harsh environment of salt seawater are typical challenges for the coastal engineer – as are the morphodynamic changes of the coastal topography, caused both by the autonomous development of the system and man-made changes. The areas of interest in coastal engineering include the coasts of the oceans, seas, marginal seas, estuaries and big lakes.

Besides the design, building and maintenance of coastal structures, coastal engineers are often interdisciplinary involved in integrated coastal zone management, also because of their specific knowledge of the hydro- and morphodynamics of the coastal system. This may include providing input and technology for e.g. environmental impact assessment, port development, strategies for coastal defense, land reclamation, offshore wind farms and other energy-production facilities, etc.

Specific challenges

The coastal environment produces challenges specific for this branch of engineering: waves, storm surges, tides, tsunamis, sea level changes, sea water and the marine ecosystem.

Most often, in coastal engineering projects there is a need for metocean conditions: local wind and wave climate, as well as statistics for and information on other hydrodynamic quantities of interest. Also, bathymetry and morphological changes are of direct interest. In case of studies of sediment transport and morphological changes, relevant properties of the sea bed sediments, water and ecosystem properties are needed.

Long and short waves
 
The occurrence of wave phenomena – like sea waves, swell, tides and tsunamis – require engineering knowledge of their physics, as well as models: both numerical models and physical models. The practices in present-day coastal engineering are more-and-more based on models verified and validated by experimental data.

Apart from the wave transformations themselves, for the waves coming from deep water into the shallow coastal waters and surf zone, the effects of the waves are important. These effects include:
 the wave loading on coastal structures like breakwaters, groynes, jetties, sea walls and dikes
 wave-induced currents, like the longshore current in the surf zone, rip currents and Stokes drift, affecting sediment transport and morphodynamics
 wave agitation in harbors, which may result in harbor downtime
 wave overtopping over seawalls and dikes, which may e.g. threaten the stability of a dike

See also

 Beach erosion and accretion
 Beach evolution
 Beach nourishment
 Modern recession of beaches
 Raised beach
 Integrated coastal zone management
 Coastal management, to prevent coastal erosion and creation of beach
 Coastal and oceanic landforms
 Coastal development hazards
 Coastal erosion
 Coastal geography
 Coastal engineering
 Hard engineering
 Soft engineering
 Coastal morphodynamics
 Coastal and Estuarine Research Federation (CERF)
 Human impacts on coasts
 Sea level rise
 Natural hazard
 Erosion
 Bioerosion
 Blowhole
 Natural arch
 Wave-cut platform
 Longshore drift
 Deposition (sediment)
 Coastal sediment supply
 Sand dune stabilization
 Submersion

Notes

References

External links

 – Proceedings of the International Conference on Coastal Engineering (ICCE), held since 1950 (biannually since 1960).

 
Civil engineering
Coastal construction